The 1944 Brown Bears football team represented Brown University during the 1944 college football season.

In their first season under head coach Charles "Rip" Engle, the Bears compiled a 3–4–1 record, and were outscored 150 to 132 by opponents. R.E. Lowe was the team captain.  

Brown played its home games at Brown Stadium in Providence, Rhode Island.

Schedule

References

Brown
Brown Bears football seasons
Brown Bears football